Chelmsford Park and Ride is a park and ride bus service operated by Vectare on behalf of Essex County Council. Two routes are operated serving two park and ride sites in Sandon and Chelmer Valley. The service was previously operated by First Essex for 15 years from opening until 5 March 2022. The service was suspended on 28 March 2020 due to the COVID-19 pandemic. The Sandon service resumed on the 6th July 2020 with an every 15 minute circular service and Chelmer Valley on the 3rd August 2020 with an every 30 minute service.

Current Service
Two services are operated, Sandon Circular & Chelmer Valley Circular.

Previous Service
A Cross City service used to operate serving both sites operated by First Essex.

Park and Ride Sites
Currently there are two park and ride sites in Chelmsford. One in Sandon southeast of the city and another in Chelmer Valley to the north of the city. During the COVID-19 pandemic Chelmer Valley Park and Ride Site was planned to be used as a temporary mortuary, but this did not happen in the end.

Fleet
Vectare currently operate a fleet of nine Enviro200MMC buses between both services.

References

Park and ride schemes in the United Kingdom
Transport in the City of Chelmsford